Education in Peja, Kosovo is a based on a system with no tuition fees, mandatory for all children between ages 6 and 18. It consists of a nine-year basic comprehensive school (starting at age six and ending at age fifteen), secondary general and professional education commonly known as high school, and higher education (university). It also includes non-mandatory daycare programs for babies and toddlers, and a one-year "preschool". The school year runs from early September to late June of the following year. Winter break runs from late December to early January, dividing the school year into two semesters.

Peja is the only city in Kosovo that offers high school education in arts and general education for the visually impaired.

Elementary education
Elementary education is divided in two parts. The first includes grades from 1 to 5 in which the students are taught by a single teacher. The second part is known as the lower secondary education, and includes grades from 6 to 9. Each subject is taught by a different teacher specialized in their subject.

Elementary schools

Asdreni
Vaso Pashë Shkodrani
Lidhja Prizrenit
Tetë Marsi
Ramiz Sadiku
Dardania
Xhemajl Kada
Smajl Hajdaraj
Hil Mosi
Lidhja e Pejes
7 Shtatori
Sami Frasheri
Skenderbeu
Ali Kelmendi
Rilindja
Skender Çeku
Haxhi Zeka
Zef Serembe
Naum Veqilhargji
28 Nëntori
Fan Noli
Dëshmorët e kombit
Migjeni
Pjetër Budi
2 Korriku
Mehmet Shoshi
Përparimi
Janko Joviqeviq

High school education
Secondary education includes grades from 10 to 12 and each school is divided into its own departments.

High school

Gymnasium Bedri Pejani is divided into four departments: the natural sciences department, social studies, computing and mathematics and the language department.

Professional education

Professional education is a part of the educational system and professional training that enables students who have finished mandatory education to be included in a democratic society as active and competent participants, and to engage in the constantly changing labor market.

There are two professional high schools in Peja:

Technical School Shaban Spahija in its composition has three separate objects in different parts of the city, with ten workshops: computing, electro installations, auto mechanic, metallurgy, auto coloring, hydro installing, construction, carpentry, tailoring and costume design which are equipped with adequate utensils for maintaining practical lessons. The learning process is divided into four professional subjects: electrotechnics, machinery, construction and textile.

 

Economic School Ali Hadri offers education in juristics, food technology, customs, catering and tourism, veterinary medicine, banking and finance and business administration.

 

School of Applied Arts Odhise Paskali is the only high school in Kosovo that offers secondary education in applied arts. Its departments consist of interior design, graphic design, ceramics, textile and painting.
Medical School of Peja is a secondary education school which offers studies in the field of medicine. It is divided into five departments: general medicine, pharmacy, dentistry, nursing and midwifery and pediatrics.

Private Schools
The private schools in Peja offer education from sixth to twelfth grade. The number of students per class is generally smaller than in public school and the schedule is longer.

Cambridge Gymnasium is the first private school in Peja. On October 10, 2006 it was licensed for lower secondary education and upper secondary education that offers studies in natural sciences, computing and mathematics.
Euroschool

Number of students and teachers according to the 2011-2012 statistics:

Number of students based on ethnicity according to the 2011-2012 statistics:

Other

Music school Halit Kasapolli

The "Halit Kasapolli" school of music is the only school of its kind in Peja. Named after the composer from Peja Halit Kasapolli, it was begun in 2008. In the absence of profile singing the students study Music Theory and Instruments: piano, clarinet, violin, flute and guitar.

School for the visually impaired Dr. Xheladin Deda

School for the blind and the visually impaired – resource center Dr. Xheladin Deda in Peja is the only institution in Kosovo that offers education to blind and visually impaired children. It was founded in 1982 and works as a public institution financed by the Kosovo Ministry of Education.

Universities

Haxhi Zeka University

The public university Haxhi Zeka is originally a descendant of the Faculty of Applied Business Sciences (FABS) in Peja that was founded in 1960 with the decision of KSAK as an Economic-Commercial high school in Peja. At the beginning the school only consisted of the Commercial Business in the enterprise department and a small number of teachers.

Now it consists of the following faculties: 

Faculty of business
Law school
Faculty of Management in tourism, catering and environment
Faculty of agribusiness
Faculty of arts

European College Dukagjini

The European College Dukagjini began in October 2006, and immediately enrolled more than 600 students in one academic year (2006/2007). Based on this significant demand, expectations are that this university could, in one five-year cycle of studies, have at least 4000 to 5000 students.

European Dukagjini College includes the following faculties:

Faculty of Economy with the departments:
Banking, Finance and Accounting
Management and Informatics
Business Administration
Applied Informatics

Faculty of law with the departments:
General Law
International relations

Faculty of Biotechnology
Department of Food Biotechnology

See also 
 Peja
 Education in Kosovo
 Haxhi Zeka University

References

External Links
IKEA foundation article about Peja including its education system

Peja
Peja